The Muradiye Mosque is a 16th-century Ottoman mosque in the town of Manisa in southwest Turkey. It was commissioned by the sultan Murad III and designed by the imperial architect Mimar Sinan.

History
The Muradiye Mosque in Manisa was built between 1583 and 1586 for the Ottoman sultan Murad III. It replaced an earlier small mosque on the site that had been began in 1571 when prince Murad had been governor of Manisa. The sultanic mosque was designed by Mimar Sinan but built by the architect Mahmud Halife until his death and then from January 1586 by the architect Sedefkar Mehmed Aga who would later design the Sultan Ahmed Mosque in Istanbul. As well as tiled revetments some of the stonework was decorated by a team of painters sent from the capital. In 1584 the sultan ordered 150 Murano oil lamps from Venice. These were probably intended for the mosque. The associated madrasa and guest-house were not completed until after 1590. Neither Sinan nor Murad III visited Manisa to inspect the mosque after its completion.

Architecture
The mosque is built of sandstone and has a central dome and three half-domes covering the prayer hall. The portico is covered by five smaller domes and there are two single-galleried minarets. The interior is decorated with Iznik tiles. The mosque is part of a larger complex (Külliye) consisting of a medrese (Islamic school) and imaret (public charity kitchen). Most of historic Manisa was destroyed during the Greek army retreat from the city in 1922, the mosque was one of the few buildings to survive. The imaret is now the Manisa Museum.

See also
List of Friday mosques designed by Mimar Sinan

References

Sources

External links
 Muradiye Külliyesi, Manisa, Turkey, Archnet
 Photographs of the mosque by Dick Osseman

Mosques in Manisa
Ottoman mosques in Turkey
Mosques completed in 1586